The Bassac River (Tonlé Bassac) is a distributary of the Tonlé Sap and Mekong River. The river starts in Phnom Penh, Cambodia, and flows southerly, crossing the border into Vietnam near Châu Đốc. The name Bassac comes from the Khmer prefix “pa” (father or male) added to sak (សក្តិ) (power or honor),   a Khmer word borrowed from the Sanskrit “sakti” (शक्ति).

In Vietnam it is known as the Hậu River (Sông Hậu or Hậu Giang in Vietnamese).

The Bassac River is an important transportation corridor between Cambodia and Vietnam, with barges and other craft plying the waters. A city of the same name was once the west-bank capital of the Kingdom of Champasak. Sak (សក្តិ) can also be seen in the Khmer spelling of Champasak; (ចំប៉ាសក្តិ). USS Satyr (ARL-23), a recommissioned repair ship originally built for the United States Navy during World War II, served on the Bassac River during the Vietnam War.

Three bridges span the Bassac: the Monivong and Takhmao bridges in Phnom Penh, Cambodia and the Cần Thơ Bridge in Cần Thơ in Vietnam.

Approximately 8.5 kilometers to Prey Basak lies a ruined ancient temple called Prasat Prey Basak Temple, which was destroyed during the Vietnam War due to heavy bombing from the United States military. Prasat Prey Basak Temple was built by the Funan Kingdom during the 2nd and 3rd centuries. The temple is dated between 1,900 and 2,000 years old. It is considered to be the oldest prasat in Cambodia.

Gallery

References

 
Distributaries
Rivers of Cambodia
Tonlé Sap
Mekong River
Geography of Phnom Penh
International rivers of Asia
Rivers of An Giang province
Rivers of Cần Thơ
Rivers of Hậu Giang province
Rivers of Sóc Trăng province
Rivers of Trà Vinh province
Rivers of Vĩnh Long province
Rivers of Vietnam